The Zavodoukovsk constituency (No.186) is a Russian legislative constituency in Tyumen Oblast. The constituency covers parts of Tyumen and rural strip alongside southern border of the Tyumen Oblast. The constituency was created in 2016 from parts of former Tyumen constituency (Tyumen and western part) and now eliminated Ishim constituency (eastern part).

Members elected

Election results

2016

|-
! colspan=2 style="background-color:#E9E9E9;text-align:left;vertical-align:top;" |Candidate
! style="background-color:#E9E9E9;text-align:left;vertical-align:top;" |Party
! style="background-color:#E9E9E9;text-align:right;" |Votes
! style="background-color:#E9E9E9;text-align:right;" |%
|-
|style="background-color: " |
|align=left|Ivan Kvitka
|align=left|United Russia
|
|55.10%
|-
|style="background-color:"|
|align=left|Vladimir Sharpatov
|align=left|A Just Russia
|
|13.59%
|-
|style="background-color:"|
|align=left|Artyom Zaytsev
|align=left|Liberal Democratic Party
|
|10.69%
|-
|style="background-color:"|
|align=left|Aleksandr Chepik
|align=left|Communist Party
|
|7.26%
|-
|style="background:"| 
|align=left|Natalia Nesterova
|align=left|Communists of Russia
|
|4.46%
|-
|style="background:"| 
|align=left|Dmitry Kirillov
|align=left|Yabloko
|
|2.28%
|-
|style="background-color:"|
|align=left|Andrey Agarkov
|align=left|The Greens
|
|2.24%
|-
|style="background:"| 
|align=left|Aleksey Yergaliyev
|align=left|Party of Growth
|
|1.80%
|-
|style="background:"| 
|align=left|Aleksandr Kunilovsky
|align=left|People's Freedom Party
|
|1.56%
|-
| colspan="5" style="background-color:#E9E9E9;"|
|- style="font-weight:bold"
| colspan="3" style="text-align:left;" | Total
| 
| 100%
|-
| colspan="5" style="background-color:#E9E9E9;"|
|- style="font-weight:bold"
| colspan="4" |Source:
|
|}

2021

|-
! colspan=2 style="background-color:#E9E9E9;text-align:left;vertical-align:top;" |Candidate
! style="background-color:#E9E9E9;text-align:left;vertical-align:top;" |Party
! style="background-color:#E9E9E9;text-align:right;" |Votes
! style="background-color:#E9E9E9;text-align:right;" |%
|-
|style="background-color: " |
|align=left|Ivan Kvitka (incumbent)
|align=left|United Russia
|
|47.42%
|-
|style="background-color:"|
|align=left|Ivan Levchenko
|align=left|Communist Party
|
|12.05%
|-
|style="background-color:"|
|align=left|Artyom Zaytsev
|align=left|Liberal Democratic Party
|
|10.70%
|-
|style="background-color:"|
|align=left|Vladimir Sharpatov
|align=left|A Just Russia — For Truth
|
|8.82%
|-
|style="background-color: " |
|align=left|Pavel Doronin
|align=left|New People
|
|7.76%
|-
|style="background:"| 
|align=left|Rafael Bulatov
|align=left|Communists of Russia
|
|6.15%
|-
|style="background-color: "|
|align=left|Vladimir Selivanov
|align=left|Party of Pensioners
|
|4.01%
|-
| colspan="5" style="background-color:#E9E9E9;"|
|- style="font-weight:bold"
| colspan="3" style="text-align:left;" | Total
| 
| 100%
|-
| colspan="5" style="background-color:#E9E9E9;"|
|- style="font-weight:bold"
| colspan="4" |Source:
|
|}

References

Russian legislative constituencies
Politics of Tyumen Oblast